Lessemsaurus is an extinct genus of sauropod dinosaur belonging to Lessemsauridae.

Naming and description 
The type species, L. sauropoides, was formally described by José Fernando Bonaparte in 1999 in honor of Don Lessem, a writer of popular science books. It was found in the Los Colorados Formation of the Ischigualasto-Villa Unión Basin in La Rioja Province, Argentina.

It was discovered in strata dating to the Norian stage, around 210 million years ago.

Classification 

A cladogram after Pol, Garrido & Cerda, 2011, illustrates a possible placing of Lessemsaurus and Antetonitrus in Sauropodomorpha:

In 2018, Apaldetti et al. recovered it as part of a clade they named Lessemsauridae, after Lessemsaurus. Their cladogram is reproduced below:

The following cladogram shows the position of Lessemsaurus outside of Sauropoda, according to Oliver W. M. Rauhut and colleagues, 2020:

References

External links 
 

Sauropods
Dinosaur genera
Norian life
Late Triassic dinosaurs of South America
Fossils of Argentina
Triassic Argentina
Los Colorados Formation
Fossil taxa described in 1999
Taxa named by José Bonaparte